Gary William Sambrook (born 25 June 1989) is a British Conservative Party politician who has served as the Joint Executive Secretary of the backbench 1922 Committee since 2021. He has been the Member of Parliament (MP) for Birmingham Northfield since the 2019 general election.

Political career
Sambrook became a councillor for Birmingham City Council in 2014, winning the Kingstanding ward seat, based on the area of the same name, in a by-election. During his campaign to become a councillor, he appeared in the Birmingham Mail when two local supporters, Ben Coleman and Michael Mason, composed a song in support of his campaign. He has also worked for MP James Morris.

At the 2019 general election, he defeated the Labour incumbent Richard Burden by a majority of 1,640 votes, becoming the first Conservative MP for Northfield since 1992. 

Sambrook is a member of both the Procedure and Ecclesiastical Committees. According to the Financial Times, Sambrook is an "influential backbencher" and an executive secretary of the 1922 Committee.

In October 2020, Sambrook, along with most other Conservative MPs, voted against a Labour Party Opposition Day Motion to extend the emergency COVID-19 pandemic provision of providing free school meals during school holidays until Easter 2021. 

In August 2021 he opposed the conversion of a residential home into a children's home for up to four children with emotional, behavioural and educational difficulties by circulating a letter stating, among various reasons, it would have a "negative impact on the area" and would "compromise the quality of the area". Sambrook said: "All children deserve a good quality home to live in. Especially children in care." 

In October 2021, Sambrook voted against an amendment to an Environment Bill that would have made it more difficult for water companies to dump raw sewage into rivers because Sambrook maintained it "was not fully costed and there was no plan to implement it" and "was also predicted to cost around £150 billion".

In January 2022, Sambrook was named as one of the MPs plotting to oust Boris Johnson from his position as Prime Minister over Partygate. In an email to constituents he stated "I would expect anyone who is found to have broken the law to seriously consider their position in government, and that includes the Prime Minister." By February however he was no longer calling for Johnson to resign.  In July 2022, in the aftermath of the Chris Pincher scandal, Sambrook accused Johnson of blaming other people for his own mistakes and again called on him to resign.

Personal life
Sambrook is a freemason. He is gay.

References

External links

1989 births
Living people
Conservative Party (UK) MPs for English constituencies
UK MPs 2019–present
Councillors in Birmingham, West Midlands
LGBT members of the Parliament of the United Kingdom
English LGBT politicians
English Freemasons
Gay politicians